The 66th Cannes Film Festival took place in Cannes, France, from 15 to 26 May 2013. Steven Spielberg was the head of the jury for the main competition. New Zealand film director Jane Campion was the head of the jury for the Cinéfondation and Short Film sections. French actress Audrey Tautou hosted the opening and closing ceremonies. Actress Kim Novak was named guest of honour and introduced a new restored version of Alfred Hitchcock's Vertigo.

The festival opened with The Great Gatsby, directed by Baz Luhrmann and closed with Zulu, directed by Jérôme Salle. The film poster for the festival featured husband and wife actors Paul Newman and Joanne Woodward. The Bling Ring, directed by Sofia Coppola, opened the Un Certain Regard section.

The French film Blue Is the Warmest Colour won the Palme d'Or. In an unprecedented move, along with the director, the Jury decided to take "the exceptional step" of awarding the film's two main actresses, Adèle Exarchopoulos and Léa Seydoux, with the Palme d'Or.

On the occasion of 100 Years of Indian Cinema, India was the Official Guest Country at the 2013 Cannes Film Festival. Seven Indian feature films were premiered among various sections on the festival. Actress Vidya Balan was one of the official Jury of the festival. The first Incredible India Exhibition, a joint participation of the Ministry of Tourism and Ministry of Information and Broadcasting, Republic of India was inaugurated by Indian delegate Chiranjeevi.

Juries

Main competition
Steven Spielberg, American film director, Jury President 
Daniel Auteuil, French actor
Vidya Balan, Indian actress
Naomi Kawase, Japanese film director
Ang Lee, Taiwanese-American film director
Nicole Kidman, Australian actress
Cristian Mungiu, Romanian film director
Lynne Ramsay, Scottish film director
Christoph Waltz, Austrian-German actor

Un Certain Regard
Thomas Vinterberg, Danish film director, Jury President
Zhang Ziyi, Chinese actress
Ludivine Sagnier, French actress
Ilda Santiago, Festival do Rio director
Enrique Gonzalez Macho, Spanish producer and distributor

Caméra d'Or
Agnès Varda, French film director, Jury President
Isabel Coixet, Spanish film director
Régis Wargnier, French film director
Chloe Rolland, Syndicat de la Critique
Michel Abramowicz, AFC
Eric Guirado, SRF
Gwenole Bruneau, FICAM

Cinéfondation and short films
Jane Campion, New Zealand film director, Jury President
Maji-da Abdi, Ethiopian actress and film director 
Nicoletta Braschi, Italian actress and producer
Nandita Das, Indian actress and film director
Semih Kaplanoğlu, Turkish film director

Independent juries
The following independent juries awarded films in the frame of the International Critics' Week.

Nespresso Grand Prize
Miguel Gomes, Portuguese film director, Jury President
Dennis Lim, American film programmer and critic
Alin Taşçıyan, Turkish film critic
Neil Young, English film curator and critic
Alex Vicente, Spanish film journalist

Discovery Award for Short Film
Mia Hansen-Løve, French film director, Jury President
Brad Deane, Canadian film curator
Savina Neirotti, Italian program officer for the Biennale College of Cinema
Johannes Palermos, Swedish program coordinator at the Stockholm International Film Festival
Lorna Tee, Malaysian film festival consultant and film producer

France 4 Visionary Award
Mia Hansen-Løve, French film director, Jury President
Luo Jin, Chinese film critic
Eren Odabasi, Turkish film critic
Thiago Stivaletti, Brazilian film critic
Simon Pellegry, French film critic

Official selection

In competition - Feature films
The following films have been selected for the In Competition section. The Palme d'Or winner has been highlighted.

Un Certain Regard
The following films have been selected in the Un Certain Regard section.  The Un Certain Regard Prize winner has been highlighted.

(CdO) indicates film eligible for the Caméra d'Or as directorial debut feature.

Films out of Competition
The following films were selected to play out of competition:

(CdO) indicates film eligible for the Caméra d'Or as directorial debut feature.

Special screenings
The following films were presented in the Special screenings section:

Cinéfondation
The Cinéfondation section focuses on films made by students at film schools. The following 18 entries (14 fiction films and 4 animation films) were selected, out of 1,550 submissions from 277 different schools. One-third of the films selected represented schools competing for the first time. It was also the first time for a Chilean film to be selected in Cinéfondation. The winner of the Cinéfondation First Prize has been highlighted.

Short film competition
Out of 3,500 submissions, the following films were selected to compete for the Short Film Palme d'Or. The Short film Palme d'Or winner has been highlighted.

Cannes Classics
The Festival uses Cannes Classics to place the spotlight on rediscovered or restored masterworks from the past, or ones that have been re-released in theatres or on DVD.

Cinéma de la Plage
The Cinéma de la Plage is a part of the Official Selection. The outdoors screenings at the beach cinema of Cannes are open to the public.

Parallel sections

International Critics' Week
The line-up for the International Critics’ Week was announced on 22 April at the section's website. The following films were selected:

Feature films - The winner of the Grand Prix Nespresso has been highlighted. 

(CdO) indicates film eligible for the Caméra d'Or as directorial debut feature.

Short films - The winner of the Canal+ Award has been highlighted.

Special Screenings

(CdO) indicates film eligible for the Caméra d'Or as directorial debut feature.

Directors' Fortnight
The line-up for the Directors' Fortnight was announced at a press conference on 23 April with the following films being selected.

Feature films - The winner of the Art Cinema Award (and the Prix SACD) has been highlighted.

(CdO) indicates film eligible for the Caméra d'Or as directorial debut feature.

Short films

Awards

Official awards
The French film Blue Is the Warmest Colour, directed by Abdellatif Kechiche, won the Palme d'Or. In a first for the competition, the jury decided to award the Palme d'Or to Kechiche and the actresses who star in the film: Adèle Exarchopoulos and Léa Seydoux. Blue Is the Warmest Colour is a coming-of-age film that tells the story of a lesbian relationship between a 15-year-old girl and an older woman. It has shocked some critics with its graphic and controversial sex scenes. A reporter for the Radio France Internationale stated that Kechiche paid tribute to the "Tunisian revolution" and "the right to love freely" during his acceptance speech. The president of the jury, Steven Spielberg, said "The film is a great love story … We were absolutely spellbound by the two brilliant young actresses, and the way the director observed his young players." The Grand Prix was won by the Coen brothers's Inside Llewyn Davis, while Bruce Dern and Bérénice Bejo were awarded Best Actor and Best Actress respectively.

The following films and people received the 2013 Official Selection awards:

In Competition
 Palme d'Or: Blue Is the Warmest Colour by Abdellatif Kechiche
 Honorary Palme d'Or: Adèle Exarchopoulos and Léa Seydoux for Blue Is the Warmest Colour
 Grand Prix: Inside Llewyn Davis by Joel & Ethan Coen 
 Best Director: Amat Escalante for Heli
 Best Screenplay: Jia Zhangke for A Touch of Sin
 Best Actress: Bérénice Bejo for The Past
 Best Actor: Bruce Dern for Nebraska
 Jury Prize: Like Father, Like Son by Hirokazu Koreeda

Un Certain Regard
 Prix Un Certain Regard: The Missing Picture by Rithy Panh
 Un Certain Regard Special Jury Prize: Omar by Hany Abu-Assad
 Un Certain Regard Best Director: Alain Guiraudie for Stranger by the Lake
 Un Certain Regard Best First Film: Fruitvale Station by Ryan Coogler
 A Certain Talent: Diego Quemada-Diez for The Golden Cage

Golden Camera
 Caméra d'Or – Ilo Ilo by Anthony Chen

Cinéfondation
 1st Prize: Needle by Anahita Ghazvinizadeh
 2nd Prize: Waiting for the Thaw (En attendant le dégel) by Sarah Hirtt
 3rd Prize: In the Fishbowl (În acvariu) by Tudor Cristian Jurgiu

Short Films
 Short Film Palme d'Or: Safe by Moon Byoung-gon
 Special Distinction Ex-aequo:
 Hvalfjordur (Whale Valley) by Guðmundur Arnar Guðmundsson
 37°4 S by Adriano Valerio

Independent awards
FIPRESCI Prizes
 Blue Is the Warmest Colour by Abdellatif Kechiche (In Competition)
 Manuscripts Don't Burn by Mohammad Rasoulof (Un Certain Regard)
 Blue Ruin by Jeremy Saulnier (Directors' Fortnight)

Vulcan Award of the Technical Artist
Vulcan Award: Antoine Héberlé (cinematography) for Grigris

Ecumenical Jury
 Prize of the Ecumenical Jury: The Past by Asghar Farhadi
 Prize of the Ecumenical Jury - Special Mention: Miele by Valeria Golino & Like Father, Like Son by Hirokazu Koreeda

Awards in the frame of International Critics' Week
 Nespresso Grand Prize: Salvo by Fabio Grassadonia and Antonio Piazza
 France 4 Visionary Award: Salvo by Fabio Grassadonia and Antonio Piazza
 Special Mention: Los Dueños by Agustín Toscano and Ezequiel Radusky
 Discovery Award for short film: Come and Play by Daria Belova
 Canal+ Short Film Award: Pleasure by Ninja Thyberg

Awards in the frame of Directors' Fortnight
 Art Cinema Award: Me, Myself and Mum by Guillaume Gallienne
 Prix SACD: Me, Myself and Mum by Guillaume Gallienne
 Europa Cinemas: The Selfish Giant by Clio Barnard
 Premier Prix Illy for Short Filmmaking: A Wild Goose Chase by Joao Nicolau
 Special Mention: About a Month by Andre Novais Oliveira

Association Prix François Chalais
 Prix François Chalais: Grand Central by Rebecca Zlotowski

Queer Palm Jury
 Queer Palm Award: Stranger by the Lake by Alain Guiraudie

Palm Dog Jury
 Palm Dog Award: Baby Boy in Behind the Candelabra

References

External links

Official website Retrospective 2013 
66ème Festival de Cannes
Cannes Film Festival: Awards for 2013 at Internet Movie Database 
 A timeline of India at Cannes

Cannes Film Festival
Cannes Film Festival
Cannes Film Festival
Cannes Film Festival